Al-Ḍuḥā (“The Morning Hours”, “Morning Bright” ,"The Early Hours") is the ninety-third chapter (surah) of the Qur'an,  with 11 āyat or verses. Qur'an 93 takes its name from Arabic its opening word, al-ḍuḥā, "the morning".

Although there is some debate amongst scholars, this sura is often considered to be the second revealed to the Islamic prophet Muhammad. After the first sura was received, al-Alaq, there was a period of silence in which no further messages were revealed. During this time, Muhammad wondered if he had somehow displeased God, who it seemed for a while was no longer sending down His message. This sura broke that silence, and reassured Muhammad that all will be understood in time.

The image of the morning (al-ḍuḥā) is the first word of the sura, and can be understood as symbolizing Muhammad's "new day" as the Messenger of God, as well as the "dawn" of the new way of life that would become Islam. After this sura, the visitations of Gabriel with the words of the Qur'an would come to Muhammad regularly until his death.

The chapter begins with oaths. It then asks to reflect and prepares the reader for the ultimate lesson that is about to come. And then The ultimate lesson in this surah is: Allah gives favours to His Messenger i.e. Duha, Al-Inshirah, and Al-Kawthar. To conclude – Allah will tell what the Messenger of Allah should do to show gratefulness for all the favours and how his followers can follow his example of gratefulness. Because of subject matter, length, style, and placement in the Qur'an, this sura is often coupled with sura al-Inshirah, sometimes without the basmala between them. They are generally considered to have been revealed around the same time.

Summary
1-3 Muhammad comforted by the assurance that God is with him
4-5 The life to come to be preferred to the present life
6-11 Muhammad exhorted to care for the orphan and beggar

Period of revelation

Its subject matter clearly indicates that it belongs to the earliest period at Mecca. Traditions also show that the revelations were suspended for a time, which caused Muhammad to be deeply distressed and grieved. On this account he felt very anxious that perhaps he had committed some error because of which his Lord had become angry with him and had forsaken him. Thereupon he was given the consolation that revelation had not been stopped because of some displeasure but this was necessitated by the same expediency as underlies the peace and stillness of the night after the bright day, as if to say: "If you had continuously been exposed to the intensely bright light of Revelation waḥy your nerves could not have endured it. Therefore, an interval was given in order to afford you peace and tranquility." This state was experienced by Muhammad in the initial stage of the Prophethood when he was not yet accustomed to hear the intensity of Revelation. On this basis, observance of a pause in between was necessary. This we have already explained in the introduction to sura al-Muddaththir; and in E. N. 5 of Surah al-Muzzammil also we have explained what great burden of the coming down of Revelation he had to bear. Later, when Muhammad developed the power to bear this burden, there was no longer any need for long gaps.

Theme and subject matter
 
The Surat's theme is to console Muhammad and its object to remove his anxiety and distress, which he had been caused by the suspension of Revelation. First of all, swearing an oath by the bright morning and the stillness of night, he has been reassured, so as to say: "Your Lord has not at all forsaken you, nor is he displeased with you." Then, he has been given the good news that the hardships that he was experiencing in the initial stage of his mission, would not last long, for every later period of life for him would be better than the former period, and before long God would bless him so abundantly that he would be well pleased. This is one of the express prophecies of the Qur'an, which proved literally true, afterwards, whereas when this prophecy was made there seemed not to be the remotest chance that the helpless and powerless man who had come out to wage a war against the ignorance and paganism of the entire nation, would ever achieve such wonderful success.

Then, addressing Muhammad, God says: "O My dear Prophet, what has caused you the anxiety and distress that your Lord has forsaken you, and that We are displeased with you? Whereas the fact is that We have been good to you with kindness after kindness ever since the day of your birth. You were born an orphan, We made the best arrangement for your upbringing and care: you were unaware of the Way, We showed you the Way; you were indigent, We made you rich. All this shows that you have been favored by Us from the very beginning and Our grace and bounty has been constantly focused on you." Here, one should also keep in view vv. 37-42 of surah Ta-Ha, where God, while sending the Prophet Moses to confront a tyrant like Pharaoh, encouraged and consoled him, saying: "We have been looking after you with kindness ever since your birth; therefore, you should be satisfied that you will not be left alone in this dreadful mission. Our bounty will constantly be with you."

In conclusion, God has instructed Muhammad telling him how he should treat the creatures of God to repay for the favors He has done him and how he should render thanks for the blessings He has bestowed on him.

See also 
 Salah (prayer)
 Zuhr (mid-day prayer)
The Early Hours is a bestseller book of England about Ad-Dhuha chapter in Quran and Ottoman state.

References

External links 
Quran 93 Clear Quran translation

Dhuha